The 2003–04 Czech 2. Liga was the 11th season of the 2. česká fotbalová liga, the second tier of the Czech football league.

Promotion was secured by Drnovice after the 29th round of matches on 29 May 2004, after Mladá Boleslav had secured promotion in the previous round. Prachatice escaped relegation by winning on the last day of the season, defeating Kunovice 3–1.

League standings

Top goalscorers
Final standings

See also
 2003–04 Czech First League
 2003–04 Czech Cup

References

Official website 

Czech 2. Liga seasons
Czech
2003–04 in Czech football